So Many Ways/If the Whole World Stopped Lovin’ is an album by American country singer Eddy Arnold, released in 1973 on the MGM Records label. The album reached #32 in the US Country chart. Two singles from the album charted, “So Many Ways” which reached #28 in the US country chart and #15 in the Canadian country chart, and “If the Whole World Stopped Lovin’" which reached #56 and #76 in the US and Canadian country charts respectively.

Track listing
Source:
"So Many Ways" (Bobby Stevenson) – 2:50
"Some Sunday Morning" (M.K. Jerome, Ray Heindorf, Ted Koehler) – 2:58
"Only You (And You Alone)" (Buck Ram, Ande Rand) – 2:28
"Once in a While" (Michael Edwards, Bud Green) – 2:50
"Among My Souvenirs" (Edgar Leslie, Horatio Nicholls) – 3:09
"If the Whole World Stopped Lovin’" (Ben Peters) – 2:33
"My Special Angel" (Jimmy Duncan) – 2:42
"At the End of a Long Long Day" (Johnny Marvin, Billy Moll) – 2:20
"I Almost Lost My Mind" (Ivory Joe Hunter) – 2:06
"My Son I Wish You Everything" (Clyde Otis, Lou Stallman) – 3:17

Production

Produced by: Mike Curb, Don Costa
Arranged by: Don Costa, Bob Summers
Background vocals: The Mike Curb Congregation

References

1973 albums
MGM Records albums
Eddy Arnold albums
Albums produced by Mike Curb
Albums produced by Don Costa